Elise Mertens and Demi Schuurs were the defending champions, but Mertens chose not to participate and Schuurs chose to compete in Sydney instead.

Chan Hao-ching and Latisha Chan won the title, defeating Kirsten Flipkens and Johanna Larsson in the final, 6–3, 3–6, [10–6].

Seeds

Draw

Draw

References
Main Draw

Hobart International - Doubles
2019 Hobart International